Milove is the easternmost urban-type settlement in the Starobilsk Raion of Luhansk Oblast in eastern Ukraine. Population: . Prior to 2020, it was the administrative centre of the former Milove Raion. The town is currently occupied by Russian troops.

The town is adjacent to the Russian town of Chertkovo in Rostov Oblast. Its train station used to be on the Russian side of the border at Chertkovo railway station.

History 
Milove was first mentioned in 1872 as khutir. It was a small settlement in Kharkov Governorate of the Russian Empire.

It has had the status of an urban-type settlement since 1938.

During World War II it was under German occupation from July 1942 to January 1943. Later, it was a Soviet stronghold during the Battle of Kursk.

In January 1959 the population was 4592 people.

In January 1989 the population was 5921 people.

At the outbreak of the War in Donbas, Milove was not very affected by the war that raged in much of the region. However, on November 12, 2014, a Ukrainian border guard office was shot at with a grenade launcher leaving no casualties. Political tensions led to security cameras being installed on the Russian side of the border, and a fence being erected on the Ukrainian side of the border. On November 27, 2015, two Russian servicemen were detained in the city, and later exchanged back to Russian authorities.

It was occupied by Russian forces on February 24, 2022, during the 2022 Russian invasion of Ukraine.

People from Milove 
 Yuriy Harbuz (born 1971), Ukrainian politician

References

Urban-type settlements in Starobilsk Raion
Starobilsk Raion
Russia–Ukraine border crossings